Business routes of Interstate 80 (I-80) exist in four states: California, Nevada, Utah, and Wyoming.

California
Interstate business routes in California are assigned by the California Department of Transportation (Caltrans) but are not maintained by Caltrans unless they overlay other routes of the state highway system. Local authorities may request route assignment from the Caltrans Transportation System Information Program, and all requests require approval of the executive committee of the American Association of State Highway and Transportation Officials (AASHTO).

Sacramento

Interstate 80 Business (I-80 Bus.), called the Capital City Freeway in its entirety, is a business loop of I-80 through Sacramento. Unlike most business routes in California, it is state-maintained and assigned route numbers in the state highway system—part of US Route 50 (US 50) on its western half and unsigned State Route 51 (SR 51) on its eastern half. The full road is a freeway and carried I-80 until 1981, when the signage and designation of I-80 was transferred to the Beltline Freeway, previously signed as I-880. At that time, AASHTO assigned the I-305 designation to the west half, which met Interstate Highway standards. However, Caltrans has never signed this number, put it on any road signs, or used it internally.

Truckee

Interstate 80 Business (I-80 Bus.) was a business loop in Truckee. It served as a loop around Truckee near I-80 and traversed through Donner Pass Road. All signs and references to the business loop were removed between 2003 and 2004 as part of the reconstruction of I-80 through the area.

Nevada

Verdi

Reno–Sparks

Wadsworth–Fernley

Lovelock

Winnemucca

Battle Mountain

Elko

Wells

West Wendover, Nevada–Wendover, Utah

Wendover Boulevard was originally part of US 40, which connected California to New Jersey via Nevada and Utah. A portion of the Nevada segment is concurrent with US 93 Alternate (US 93 Alt), and the entire portion in Utah is coterminous with Utah State Route 58 (SR-58). The Nevada Department of Transportation (NDOT) applied for the business loop designation in the early 1980s, but the designation has never been approved; nevertheless, signs are posted in both states. Between July 1976 and 1993, I-80 Bus was concurrent with Nevada State Route 224 (SR 224) in Nevada.

Wyoming

Evanston

Interstate 80 Business (I-80 Bus.) is a business loop of I-80 that runs  through Evanston in western Uinta County. The business route is coexistent with US 189 Bus for its entire length. I-80 Bus begins at I-80 exit 3; the ramp from westbound I-80 to the business route lies east of the other three ramps of the diamond interchange. The business routes heads east along Harrison Drive, which veers northeast onto 11th Street at the western edge of the city street grid. In the downtown area, I-80 Bus turns southeast onto Front Street. At the intersection of Front Street and 6th Street, which is the northern terminus of Wyoming Highway 150 (WYO 150) and the southern terminus of WYO 89, the business route turns north and crosses the Union Pacific Railroad's Evanston Subdivision rail line. I-80 Bus crosses the Bear River, then turns east onto Bear River Drive (Lincoln Highway) while WYO 89 continues north. The business route follows Bear River Drive east until it rejoins I-80 at exit 6.

Fort Bridger–Lyman

Interstate 80 Business (I-80 Bus.) is a business loop of I-80 that has a length of  through Fort Bridger and Lyman in eastern Uinta County. The business route begins at I-80 exit 34 where it heads east across Blacks Fork of the Green River and passes through the unincorporated town of Fort Bridger, which contains the namesake historic fort. I-80 Bus intersects WYO 414 in the hamlet of Urie then curves north onto the town of Lyman. The business route follows Main Street, then intersects the southern end of WYO 413 within a sharp curve east onto Clark Street. I-80 Bus leaves the town and curves northeast, then crosses Smiths Fork, a tributary of Blacks Fork, before rejoining I-80 at exit 48.

Green River

Interstate 80 Business (I-80 Bus.) is a business loop of I-80 within Green River that spans  through Green River in western Sweetwater County. The business route is coexistent with US 30 Bus for its entire length and avoids the Green River Tunnel on I-80. I-80 Bus begins at exit 89, a trumpet interchange that connects with the eastern terminus of WYO 374. The highway heads southeast parallel to the Green River along Flaming Gorge Way through the center of Green River. Near the east end of the city, I-80 Bus parallels a Union Pacific Railroad railyard that serves as the western end of the railroad's Rawlins Subdivision and the eastern end of the Evanston Subdivision. Next to the railyard, the business route has an intersection with WYO 530 (Uinta Drive), which heads north, then curves back south and bridges the business route and the railyard on its way to the portion of the city south of the Green River. Immediately east of WYO 530, I-80 Bus rejoins the mainline Interstate at exit 91, another trumpet interchange.

Rock Springs

Interstate 80 Business (I-80 Bus.) is a business loop of I-80 that runs  through Rock Springs in central Sweetwater County. The business route is coexistent with US 30 Bus for its entire length. I-80 Bus begins at exit 102 and heads east along Dewar Drive. The highway curves northeast and passes to the north of downtown Rock Springs. Downtown is served by WYO 430, which I-80 Bus intersects just east of a rail line that branches north from the Union Pacific Railroad's Rawlins Subdivision. The business route follows Center Street west of WYO 430 and Bridger Avenue to the east, then follows Pilot Butte Avenue through the eastern part of the city to its eastern junction with I-80 at exit 107.

Rawlins

Interstate 80 Business (I-80 Bus.) is a business loop of I-80 that has a length of  through Rawlins in western Carbon County. The business route is coexistent with US 30 Bus for its entire length. I-80 Bus begins at I-80 exit 211 on the western edge of the city and heads east concurrently with WYO 789 along Spruce Street. In downtown Rawlins, at the intersection of Spruce Street and 3rd Street, the business route turns south onto 3rd Street, WY 789 turns north onto 3rd Street, and the business route begins to run concurrently with US 287. Three blocks to the south, I-80 Bus and US 287 turn east onto Cedar Street and parallel the Union Pacific Railroad along its Rawlins railyard, which serves as the boundary between the Rawlins Subdivision to the west and the Laramie Subdivision to the east. The highway meets the southern end of US 287 Bypass (US 287 Byp; Higley Boulevard) shortly before reaching its eastern end at I-80 exit 215. Within the trumpet interchange on the south side of I-80, the interchange ramps meet the western end of WYO 76, which heads east toward Sinclair.

Laramie

Interstate 80 Business (I-80 Bus.) is a business loop of I-80 that spans  through Laramie in southern Albany County. I-80 Bus begins at I-80 exit 310 and heads east along Curtis Street, which crosses over the Laramie River and the Union Pacific Railroad's Laramie Subdivision. The business route turns south onto 3rd Street, along which the highway runs concurrently with US 30 and US 287. In downtown Laramie, I-80 Bus and US 30 turn east onto Grand Avenue, which runs along the southern edge of the University of Wyoming campus. The highway curves southeast and leaves the city of Laramie just north of its end at the trumpet interchange of I-80 exit 316.

Cheyenne

Interstate 80 Business (I-80 Bus.) is a business loop of I-80 that runs  through Cheyenne in central Laramie County. I-80 Bus begins at I-80 exit 358, a three-ramp partial cloverleaf interchange next to the Union Pacific Railroad's Laramie Subdivision rail line at the western city limits of Cheyenne. WYO 225 (Otto Road) heads southwest from the interchange and I-80 Bus and US 30 head east along Lincolnway. The interchange has no ramp to eastbound I-80; that movement is made via the business route's four-ramp partial cloverleaf interchange with I-25 and US 87 a short distance to the east. I-80 Bus and US 30 intersect Missile Drive, cross Crow Creek, and have an at-grade crossing of a BNSF Railway line before entering downtown Cheyenne. In the center of downtown, north of the Cheyenne railyard and the Cheyenne Depot Museum, the highways intersect US 85, I-25 Bus, and the northern end of I-180. Those north–south highways use Central Avenue southbound and Warren Avenue northbound. I-80 Bus and US 30 leave downtown Cheyenne and the vicinity of the railroad as they pass Holiday Park. On the east side of Cheyenne at Lincolnway's intersection with WYO 212 (College Drive), US 30 continues east and I-80 Bus turns south onto WYO 212. The business route and state highway cross over Union Pacific Railroad's Sidney Subdivision on the way to the eastern terminus of I-80 Bus at I-80 exit 364 across from the Laramie County Fairgrounds.

Pine Bluffs

Interstate 80 Business (I-80 Bus.) is a business loop in the US state of Wyoming. Concurrent highway routing in the Pine Bluffs area is along US 30 (including Parsons Street). Previous concurrent routing included US 30 and State Link 53B (L-53B) in Nebraska. All signs and references to the business loop in Nebraska were completely removed in 2009, due to a decommissioning of all such related Interstate routes statewide. Business route shields were removed on the Wyoming side around the same time but were reinstalled in places along the route in Pine Bluffs in 2012.

Nebraska

Sidney

Interstate 80 Business (I-80 Bus.) was a business loop in the US state of Nebraska. Concurrent highways included Nebraska Highway 19 (N-19), US 30 (Illinois Street) and L-17J. All signs and references to the business loop were removed in 2009 due to a decommissioning of all such related Interstate routes statewide.

Lincoln

Interstate 80 Business (I-80 Bus.) was a business loop in the US state of Nebraska. It served as a services loop through Lincoln for Interstate travelers, as the Interstate was outside of the city at the time. The business route entered the city from the west at I-80, overlapping with US 6 (West "O" Street), was aligned with several downtown one-way streets, went past the University of Nebraska City/East Campuses, and exited the city to the northeast, back to the Interstate, along the US 6 (Cornhusker Highway)/US 77 corridors (generally following the old Detroit–Lincoln–Denver Highway route throughout the city). The route was established in 1962 and was decommissioned at an unknown later date.

See also

References

External links
Interstate Business Routes @ Interstate-Guide.com: Business Route 80

80
Interstate 80